The Beatles were an English rock band of the 1960s.

Beatles or The Beatles may also refer to:

Music
The Beatles (album), a 1968 album by the Beatles
"Beatles" (song), a song by Forbes
The Beatles, two albums in the Beatles discography released by Amiga Records in East Germany in 1965 and 1982
 "The Beatles", a song by Daniel Johnston that appeared on the albums Yip/Jump Music and Beam Me Up!

Others
Beatles (novel), a novel by Lars Saabye Christensen
The Beatles (TV series), an American animated television series
The Beatles (terrorist cell), an ISIS terrorist cell, with the members known as John (or Jihadi John), George, Ringo and Paul

See also
 Beetle (disambiguation)